Events from the year 1834 in Spain.

Incumbents
Monarch: Isabella II
Regent: Maria Christina of the Two Sicilies
Prime Minister - Francisco de Paula Martínez de la Rosa y Berdejo (starting 16 January)

Events
April 22 - Battle of Alsasua
October 27 - Battle of Alegría de Álava
October 28 - Battle of Venta de Echavarri
December 12 - Battle of Mendaza
December 15 - First Battle of Arquijas

Births

Deaths
May 17 - Enrique José O'Donnell, Conde de La Bisbal
Gaspar de Vigodet

See also
First Carlist War

 
1830s in Spain
Years of the 19th century in Spain